The year 1914 in radio involved some significant events.

Events
 6 October – Edwin Howard Armstrong is granted a United States patent for the regenerative circuit.

Births
 20 January – Roy Plomley, English radio broadcaster (died 1985)
 26 January – Jack de Manio, English radio broadcaster (died 1988)
 25 February – John Arlott, English cricket commentator (died 1991)
 29 April –  Deryck Guyler, English actor (died 1999)
 19 July – Hubert Gregg, English actor, songwriter and broadcaster (died 2004)
 22 July – Charles Régnier, German actor (died 2001)
 2 October – Yuri Levitan, Russian radio announcer (died 1983)
 27 October – Dylan Thomas, Welsh poet and radio broadcaster (died 1953)
 29 October – Ben Gage, American actor, singer and radio announcer (died 1978)
 25 December – Abelardo Raidi, Venezuelan sportswriter and radio broadcaster (died 2002)
 29 December – Margaret Hubble, English radio presenter (died 2006)

References

 
Radio by year